Katrine Kjær Robsøe (born 21 June 1991 in Aarhus) is a Danish politician, who is a member of the Folketing for the Social Liberal Party. She was elected into parliament at the 2019 Danish general election.

Political career
Robsøe was elected into parliament at the 2019 election, where she received 3,430 personal votes.

References

External links 
 Biography on the website of the Danish Parliament (Folketinget)

1991 births
Living people
People from Aarhus
Danish Social Liberal Party politicians
21st-century Danish women politicians
Women members of the Folketing
Members of the Folketing 2019–2022
Members of the Folketing 2022–2026